Weffer is a Venezuelan surname. Notable people with the surname include:

 Victor Cruz Weffer, commander-in-chief of the Venezuelan army
 Jaramit Weffer (born 1985), Venezuelan freestyle wrestler

Venezuelan culture
Surnames of South American origin